Local elections in Taguig took place on May 9, 2022 within the Philippine general election. The voters will vote for the elective local posts in the city: the mayor, vice mayor, two district representatives, and councilors, eight in each of the city's two legislative districts.

Background
Incumbent Mayor Lino Cayetano is eligible for reelection for his second term as mayor. However, he decided not to seek reelection, giving way for his sister-in-law, 2nd district representative and former mayor Lani Cayetano.

Incumbent Vice Mayor Ricardo Cruz is on his third term as vice mayor of Taguig, thus making him ineligible to run for the position due to term limits. Instead, he will run for representative of the 1st district of Taguig-Pateros. The ruling Nacionalista Party is fielding 2nd district councilor Arvin Ian Alit, who is term-limited after serving three terms, as Lani Cayetano's running mate.

Defeated 2019 mayoral candidate and former 1st district representative Arnel Cerafica is running again in 2022, this time choosing his wife Janelle as his running mate. They ran under the recently formed Partido Pilipino sa Pagbabago.

Candidates

Administration coalition

Primary opposition coalition

Other candidates

Election results

Mayoral election
Incumbent city mayor Lino Cayetano will not run for any position in this election. Instead, his sister-in-law, second district representative and former mayor Lani Cayetano will run for mayor. She will face former first district congressman Arnel Cerafica.

Vice mayor election
Incumbent city vice mayor Ricardo Cruz Jr. is term-limited after serving three consecutive terms. Running in his place is term-limited councilor Arvin Ian Alit. He is pitted against Cerafica's wife and running mate, Janelle Cerafica.

District representatives

1st District (Taguig-Pateros)
Municipality: Pateros
Barangays of Taguig: Bagumbayan, Bambang, Calzada, Hagonoy, Ibayo-Tipas, Ligid-Tipas, Lower Bicutan, New Lower Bicutan, Napindan, Palingon, San Miguel, Santa Ana, Tuktukan, Ususan, Wawa

Incumbent Congressman and former House Speaker Alan Peter Cayetano has opted to run for senator. Competing in his place are term-limited incumbent Vice mayor Ricardo Cruz Jr. and 2019 candidate Allan Cerafica.

2nd District
Barangays: Central Bicutan, Central Signal Village, Fort Bonifacio, Katuparan, Maharlika Village, North Daang Hari, North Signal Village, Pinagsama, South Daang Hari, South Signal Village, Tanyag, Upper Bicutan, Western Bicutan

Incumbent Congresswoman Lani Cayetano has opted to run for mayor of Taguig. Competing in her place are term-limited incumbent councilor and daughter of incumbent San Juan Congressman Ronaldo Zamora, Maria Amparo "Pammy" Zamora and former councilor and 2019 candidate Michelle Anne Gonzales.

City Council

Incumbent Councilors not contesting their seats:

District 1
 Ryanne Gutierrez (died in 2019)
 Rommel Tanyag (term limited)
 Darwin Icay (term limited, running for party-list representative under Lunas Partylist)
 Ferdinand Santos (term limited)
 Allan Paul Cruz (term limited)

District 2
 Arvin Alit (term limited, running for Vice Mayor)
 Pammy Zamora (term limited, running for 2nd District Representative)
 Noel Dizon (term limited, running for party-list representative under Yacap Partylist)
 Mher Supan (term limited)
 Erwin Manalili (term limited)

By district

1st District

|-bgcolor=black
|colspan=5|

2nd District

 

|-bgcolor=black
|colspan=5|

References

2022 Philippine local elections
Elections in Taguig
May 2022 events in the Philippines
2022 elections in Metro Manila